Current and former television programmes broadcast on Virgin Media Television (Republic of Ireland), formerly "TV3 Group".

Current

News and current affairs
   Pat Kenny Tonight (2016–present)
  Tonight with Vincent Browne (2007–2016)
  Virgin Media News at 12.30 
  Virgin Media News at 5.30 (2001–2012, rebranded: The 5.30, 2012–2017)
  Virgin Media News at 8.00 (2015–2017, 2018–present)
  Late News (2016–present)
  Virgin Media News Updates (1998–2016, rebranded: 3 News 60 Second Update 2017–2018)

Home produced shows

Entertainment
  Animal A&E
  Battle of the Bridesmaids
  Driving Me Crazy
  Driving Seat
  Friday Late with Vincent Browne
  Hen Nights
  Ireland AM (1999–present)
  Marymount Hospice
  Midday (2008–present)
  Neville's Doorstep Challenge
  Nick's Bistro
  S.O.S.– Save Our Shops
  Temple Street Children's Hospital
  The Tenements

Crime
  24 Hours to Kill
  Blackmarket Ireland
  Crimes That Shook Ireland
  Ireland Caught on Camera
  Ireland's Missing Mum's
  Lawless Ireland
  Paul Connolly Investigates...

Drama
  Deception
  Red Rock  (2015-)
  School Run

Food
  Come Dine With Me
  Stuart's Kitchen

Reality
  The Big Deal
  Celebrity Salon
  Dublin Airport: Life Stories
  Dublin Wives
  Ireland's Beauty Queens
  Ireland's Pampered Pets
  Ireland's Ultimate Debutante
  Paddies Down Under
  The Restaurant
  Style Wars 
  Tallafornia: The After Party LIVE

British shows

From ITV
  All Star Mr and Mrs (2008–present)
  Britain's Got Talent (2007–present)
  Coronation Street (2001–2014,2016–present)
  The Cube (2009–present)
  Downton Abbey (2009–present)
  Emmerdale (2001–2014,2016–present)
  All Star Family Fortunes (2006–present)
  Hell's Kitchen
  Law & Order: UK
  Love Island (2015 version) (2015–present) 
  Mr Selfridge
  The Royal
  Ultimate Force
  Who Wants to Be a Millionaire?
  Wild at Heart
  The X Factor (2005–present)
  You've Been Framed (2018–present)

From Channel 4
  Come Dine with Me
  How Clean Is Your House?

From Channel 5
  Big Brother UK
  Celebrity Big Brother UK
  Don't Stop Believing
  House Doctor

From the BBC
  DIY SOS

US Shows
  Accidentally on Purpose
  American Idol (2002–present)
  America's Got Talent (2007–present)
  America's Next Top Model
  Chuck
  Dancing with the Stars
  Friends (2009–present)
  Fringe
  Glee
  Harry's Law
  Hart of Dixie
  Hell's Kitchen
  The Jeremy Kyle Show
  Judge Judy
  Law & Order
  Law & Order: Special Victims Unit
  Prime Suspect
  Reign
  The Shield

Australian Shows
  Bondi Rescue
  Nothing to Declare
  Underbelly

Sport
  Champions League Live (2001–2004 & 2008–present)
  Champions League Magazine (2001–2004 & 2008–present)
  FA Cup Final Live: (2015–2017)
  British Horse Racing Rights including Grand National (2017–present)
     RBS 6 Nations (2018–present)

Former

News and current affairs
  Agenda (1999–2004)
  First Edition (1999–2001)
  Midweek
  News Tonight 
  TV3 News @ 6 (1998–1999)
  TV3 News @ 6.30 (2001–2005)
  TV3 News @ 7 (1999–2000)

Home produced shows
  Activity Breaks (2006–2007)
  Algorithm (2015) 
  The Apprentice (2008–2011)
  The Box 
  The Brendan Courtney Show (2005–2006)
  Celebrity Head Chef  (2011)
  Championship Throw-In (2008–2010)
  Deal or No Deal (2009–2010)
  The Dunphy Show (2003)
  Family Fortunes (2012–2014)
  A Game of Two Halves (1999)
  Head Chef 
  The Holiday Show (2013)
  Junior Head Chef
  The Lie (2014)
  Mastermind (2011–2012)
  The Morning Show with Sybil & Martin (2009–2013)
  The Offside Show
  Play TV (2009–2010)
  Popcorn
  The Property Game
  School Run
  Sports Tonight (1998–2009)
  Take Me Out Ireland (2010–2013)
  Tallafornia (2011–2013)
  X-Posé (2007–2016)
    The Tudors
  The Weakest Link (2001–2002)

Imported shows

From ITV
  Airline
  Ant & Dec's Push the Button (2010–2011)
  Ant & Dec's Saturday Night Takeaway (2002–2009)
  At Home with the Braithwaites
  Bad Girls (2001–2006)
  Britannia High
  Dancing on Ice (2006–2014)
  Footballers' Wives
  ...from Hell
  Heartbeat (2001–2010)
  I'm a Celebrity...Get Me Out of Here! (2002–2014)
  The Jeremy Kyle Show (2009–2014)
  The Krypton Factor (2007–2008)
  London's Burning
  Love Island (2005 version) (2005–2006)
  Minder
  PokerFace
  Popstar to Operastar
  Prime Suspect
  Rock Rivals
  Soapstar Superstar (2006–2007)
  Take Me Out
  Trinny & Susannah Undress...
  Who Dares, Sings! (2008)

From Channel 4
  10 Years Younger
  The F Word
  Hollyoaks (2006–2007)
  Supernanny
  Teachers
  Ultraviolet

From Channel 5
  Family Affairs

From the BBC
  Doctor Who (2005)
  Doctor Who: The Movie (2000)
  EastEnders (1998–2001)
  The Good Life
  The Graham Norton Show (2010–2014)
  Hole in the Wall
  A Life of Grime
  Over the Rainbow
  Snog Marry Avoid?
  Some Mothers Do 'Ave 'Em
  What Not to Wear

From the BBC/ITV
  Parkinson

From Living TV
  Most Haunted

From Living TV/ITV
  The Biggest Loser

Other Imported shows
  10 Years Younger
  Airline USA
  Aliens in America
  All Saints
  Ally McBeal
  Angel
  Arrested Development
  Ask Harriet
  The Beautiful Life: TBL
  The Biggest Loser
  Bionic Woman
  The Block
  Breakers
  Buffy the Vampire Slayer
  Cagney & Lacey
  Charmed
  Chicago Hope
  City Guys
  Committed
  Crossing Jordan
  Cupid
  Dallas (2012–2014)
  Daria
  Dave's World
  Dead Man's Gun
  Dilbert
  The Ellen DeGeneres Show
  Everybody Hates Chris
  Family Guy
  Fashion House
  Futurama
  The Geena Davis Show
  The Guardian
   Hercules: The Legendary Journeys
  Hot Properties
  Huff
  Hung
  JAG
  Joey
  Judging Amy
  Just Shoot Me!
  Las Vegas
  Love Boat: The Next Wave
  Mad About You
  Malcolm in the Middle
  The Middle
  Mike & Molly
  Modern Family
  NewsRadio
  The Oprah Winfrey Show
  Our House
  Outrageous Fortune
  Paradise Hotel
  Providence
  Raines
  Ricki Lake
  Ripley's Believe It or Not!
  Rude Awakening
  Satisfaction
  Seinfeld
  Seven Days
  Sex and the City
  Sliders
  Something So Right
  Sons & Daughters
  Starsky & Hutch
  Strong Medicine
   Student Bodies
  Sunset Beach
  The Swan
  Team Knight Rider
  Tim Gunn's Guide to Style
  Tru Calling
  USA High
  V
  V.I.P.
  Walker, Texas Ranger
  Wedding Band
  Wedding SOS
  What About Joan?
  Will & Grace
  The Wizard of Oz on Ice
  Wonderfalls
  World's Wildest Police Videos
  The X Factor (U.S.) (2010–2012)

Children
  Aaahh!!! Real Monsters
  The Adventures of Pete and Pete
  Anatole
   Animal Crackers
  Avenger Penguins
  The Brothers Flub
  Big Guy and Rusty the Boy Robot
   Beast Machines: Transformers
   Beast Wars: Transformers
  Birdz
  Buster & Chauncey's Silent Night
    The Busy World of Richard Scarry
   Captain Star
  Conan and the Young Warriors
   Conan the Adventurer
  D'Myna Leagues
  Dan Dare: Pilot of the Future
  Deck the Halls
   Dumb Bunnies
  Father Christmas
   Flying Rhino Junior High
   Galidor: Defenders of the Outer Dimension
  Gimme 3
  Godzilla: The Series
  Harold and the Purple Crayon
  Heavy Gear: The Animated Series
  Hey Dude
   The Hot Rod Dogs and Cool Car Cats
  Jolly Old Saint Nicholas
   The Legend of Calamity Jane
   The Loggerheads
  Mole in the Hole
  Mole's Christmas
   Mona the Vampire
  Phantom Investigators
  Prince Cinders
  Professor Bubble
   The Animated World of Ripleys Believe it or Not
  The Ren and Stimpy Show
  Rocko's Modern Life
  Roughnecks: Starship Troopers Chronicles
  Santo Bugito
  Search for Treasure Island
  Shining Time Station
  The Snowman
  Space Cases
   Salty's Lighthouse
  Transformers: Generation 2
  The Ugly Duckling's Christmas Wish
  We Wish You a Merry Christmas
   Young Hercules

Sport
  Championship Live (2008–2013: rights transferred to Sky Sports)
  Europa League Live (2009–2015: rights transferred to Setanta Sports Ireland)
  The GAA Show (2011–2013)
  League of Ireland (2001–2008: rights transferred to RTE Sport)
  Rugby World Cup Live (2007)

References

External links
 

TV3
Republic of Ireland-related lists